Christmas From The Heart is a 1998 holiday album by country music superstar Kenny Rogers.

Overview 

Allmusic panned the album, saying: "This is truly a bizarre and disappointing album, combining Rogers' bland adult contemporary versions of traditional Christmas songs with obnoxious numbers sung by children."

Track listing

Reissue 

In 2008, Koch Records reissued the CD under the same title, but with one change; the final track is omitted.

References 

1998 Christmas albums
Christmas albums by American artists
Kenny Rogers albums
Albums produced by Brent Maher
Country Christmas albums